Agathidium akallebregma is a species of round fungus beetle in the family Leiodidae. It is found in North America. It has a mandibular horn, moderately elongate body shape, and strongly concave posterior portion of the mesosternum.

References 

Leiodidae
Beetles described in 2005
Beetles of North America